Club Bàsquet Vic is a Spanish basketball club based in Vic, Catalonia.

History
The team arrived to the Spanish second league, the LEB Oro in the 2008–09 season, but renounced to play after selling the berth to CB Sant Josep. CB Vic played the next season in Liga EBA, division where they played during two seasons reaching the promotion playoffs to LEB Plata.

On 2011–12 season, the club renounces to its spot at Liga EBA and decided to play in one level lower: Copa Catalunya.

Season by season

Notable players
 Guillem Rubio
 Rafa Martínez
 Rafael Hettsheimeir
 Juan Palacios
 Eulis Báez

Trophies and awards

Trophies
LEB Plata: (1)
2008
Copa LEB Plata: (1)
2008

External links 
 Federación Española de Baloncesto
 Official CB Vic page

Catalan basketball teams
LEB Plata teams
Former LEB Oro teams
Former Liga EBA teams
Basketball teams established in 1957
1957 establishments in Spain
Vic